Hot Rod is a top-down arcade racing game developed by Sega. Released for arcades in 1988 in Japan and released worldwide in 1989, the game was available in a four-player cocktail-style arcade cabinet, as well as a three-player upright cabinet. Home computer ports were published by Activision in 1990 for the Amiga, ZX Spectrum, Amstrad CPC, Commodore 64, and Atari ST.

Gameplay
The main goal of the game is to race against up to 4 players on a variety of tracks.

Whenever a player falls off screen, gas is subtracted from their gas meter. When a player's gas meter reaches zero, their game is over. A player can pick up flashing targets symbolized with letter "G" to add 10 units of gas to the player's gas meter. If a player successfully crosses the finish line, they are rewarded additional units of gas.

After every race, players go to the Parts Shop to purchase upgrades for their car. These include: three front or rear engines, three types of bumpers, three types of spoilers, and two types of tires. There are additional types of tires including radial tires, speed tires, spike tires, and snow tires. The player may equip either a front or rear engine, but not both at once. Players may not equip a spoiler and a rear engine simultaneously.

There are 30 different races across 10 environments including: busy highways, dirt roads, a beach side, a mountain, farmlands, a snowy terrain, a desert, a construction zone, a shipyard, and city streets. There are 3 races per environment, with every third race taking the players to a stadium for a victory ceremony. Afterwards, the players find themselves in a new environment.

Reception 
In Japan, Game Machine listed Hot Rod on their June 1, 1988 issue as being the fourth most-successful upright/cockpit arcade unit of the month.

References

External links

1988 video games
Amiga games
Amstrad CPC games
Arcade video games
Atari ST games
Commodore 64 games
Sega arcade games
Top-down racing video games
ZX Spectrum games
Video games developed in Japan
Video games scored by Hiroshi Kawaguchi
Video games scored by Jeroen Tel